Gerson Sebastián Martínez Arredondo (born 10 January 1989) is a Chilean footballer who currently plays for Deportes Colina as a striker.

Personal life
He is uncle of Rubén Farfán, another professional footballer who has played for Universidad de Chile and other Chilean clubs.

Honours

Club
San Luis Quillota
 Primera B (1): 2009

Deportes Iquique
 Copa Chile (1): 2013–14

International
 Toulon Tournament (1): 2009

References

External links
 
 

1989 births
Living people
People from Quillota Province
People from Valparaíso Region
Chilean footballers
Chile youth international footballers
San Luis de Quillota footballers
Colo-Colo footballers
Cobreloa footballers
Colo-Colo B footballers
Deportes Iquique footballers
C.D. Antofagasta footballers
Deportes Colina footballers
Primera B de Chile players
Chilean Primera División players
Segunda División Profesional de Chile players
Association football forwards